La familia P. Luche is a Mexican family sitcom created by Eugenio Derbez. The series aired from August 7, 2002 to September 16, 2012 on the channel Canal de las Estrellas. It is a spin-off of a regular sketch on the XHDRBZ comedy-sketch program.

In the series, the characters live in a fictional city called "Ciudad P. Luche" where clothes and other objects are wrapped in plush. The word P. Luche, is a pun to the word plush in Spanish: peluche. The show is similar in style to the American sitcom Married...With Children, in that it depicts a comically dysfunctional family. La familia P. Luche, however, plays more like a live-action cartoon, complete with colorful sets and comic sound effects. The sitcom won a TVyNovelas Award for "Best Comedy Program" in 2008.

Cast and characters

Main
 Ludovico P. Luche (Eugenio Derbez) is the father and leader of La Familia P.Luche. He is known for his laziness and low intelligence. He often shows that he is not happy with his life including his wife and kids; he is a terrible father and employee. He always wears blue clothes—mostly suits and ties—made of plush, and is a fan of Cruz Azul.
 Federica de P. Luche (née Dávalos) (Consuelo Duval) is the mother of La Familia P.Luche. She is known for being aggressive and overdramatic with her kids and husband. She's very promiscuous, frequently flirting with other men, and is described as "golosa" (literally "greedy"). In one episode it is revealed that she cheated on her husband with the milkman and that he is the father of one of her kids (Ludoviquito). She always wears pink clothes made of plush, mostly very provocative tops and skirts. She is a fan of Club América.
 Junior P. Luche (Luis Manuel Ávila) is actually a policeman whom Federica ran over with her car; when he awoke with amnesia, they managed to keep Federica out of jail by convincing him that he was one of their kids. They went on to treat him like a 12-year-old until he developed a childish personality and they decided to adopt him. Although he is nearly middle-aged and has a beard, everybody treats him like a child; he even goes to school. He always wears orange and yellow clothes made of plush and is a fan of Cruz Azul.
 Bibi P. Luche (Regina Blandón) is considered "la rara" (the weird one) of the family, similar to Marilyn Munster from The Munsters. Bibi is the only "real" child of Ludovico and Federica. Bibi is polite and correct, and has developed a great knowledge from studying, to her parents' despair as they beg her to act "normal." She's very smart and gets good grades; she loves her family but dislikes that they object to her studiousness. She is the only one in the family with common sense, with exception of Maradonio. She is also the most understanding, but her family thinks otherwise, but as it turns out it is not just her family who object her common sense it is everyone. She always rolls her eyes when they deliver their phrase "Por qué no eres una niña normal?" (Why aren't you a normal girl?) She always wears purple clothes, and is the only family member and character who doesn't wear clothes made of plush. She also hates association football.
 Ludoviquito P. Luche (Miguel Pérez) is the youngest child of the family, Federica's second son with Ludovico. The real Ludoviquito, however, is actually not seen after the first episode, in which he hypnotizes a rich boy at summer camp into believing that he is Ludoviquito. During the entire show we don't know his real name or who his real parents are; he identifies himself as the real Ludoviquito and believes Los P.Luche are his real family. He is a troublemaker, known for pulling pranks and stealing. He always wears green clothes made of plush, including tiny hats, and is a fan of Cruz Azul.
 Exelsa (Bárbara Torres) is the family's maid, although she's known for being lazy and hating to work, preferring to sleep or watch TV; Federica does the housework and even waits on her because she doesn't want her to leave. When asked to clean the house, she responds "Yo Solo Soy La Sirvienta" (But I'm Only The Maid). She is from Argentina. She always wears a turquoise maid uniform made from plush. She is fanatic of Boca Juniors.
 Maradonio P. Luche (Brayan Gibrán Mateo) is Ludovico's illegitimate son (And very often referred as such by Federica); mothered by Exelsa, who unknowingly impregnated herself with the sample Ludovico sold to pay for Bibi's "first period" party. Maradonio is a very precocious toddler who often points out the mistakes in Ludovico's logic, he's an expert gambler and is able to recite long poems without missing a beat. The family always carries him around carelessly. He always wears yellow and lime green clothes made of plush.

Recurring characters
 Martina (Dalilah Polanco) is the P. Luches' next-door neighbor, Flavio's wife and Federica's best friend.
 Flavio (Pierre Angelo) is the P. Luches' next-door neighbor, Martina's husband and Ludovico's best friend.
 Chela (Silvia Eugenia Derbez) is the somewhat nosy and bitter apartment manager. "Chela" is both a nickname for Graciela and slang for beer, and Chela's surnames are based on Mexican brands. Silvia Eugenia Derbez is also Eugenio Derbez's real-life sister.
 Cristy (Catalina López) is the P. Luches' blind neighbor and Rigo's wife.
Rigo (Pablo Valentín) is the P. Luches' blind neighbor and Cristy's husband.
Lucrecia Dávalos (Mercedes Vaughan) is Federica's sister and Don Camerino's girlfriend.
Don Camerino (Juan Verduzco) is Ludovico's employer and Lucrecia's boyfriend. He owns half of P.Luche City, which everybody always says after his name in question form ("Don Camerino, owner of half P.Luche City?").
Abuela Francisca de Dávalos (Nora Velázquez) Lauro's wife and Federica and Lucrecia's mother.
Abuelo Lauro Dávalos (Sergio Ramos) Francisca's husband and Federica and Lucrecia's father.
"Gober" is the P. Luches' family dog.

Episodes

Series overview

Season 1 (2002–2004)

Season 2 (2007)

Season 3 (2012)

Production

Background
The series first started as a short skit in Derbez's previous shows, "Al Derecho y al Derbez" and "Derbez en Cuando" showing Ludovico, Federica, and an Asian kid starring as Ludoviquito, but when it aired it showed the change of Ludoviquito's actors and the other two kids. The explanation behind the change in actors for Ludoviquito was that he was not really Ludovico's son, but rather the product of a tryst between Federica and the milkman. While at summer camp, Ludoviquito manages to hypnotize the richest kid in camp to switch places with him. Ludovico and Federica don't even notice the difference, and not even the fact that he continually repeats "Yo soy Ludoviquito P.Luche (I am Ludoviquito P.Luche)" like a zombie makes them curious. Ludovico accidentally snaps Ludoviquito out of his trance, and the poor child begins to cry once he realizes the fate in which he is stuck.

Seasons 1-2
The first season aired from 2002 to 2004 with frequent reruns of the episodes. The season finale stated that soon the second season would be produced (with the actors leaving a "goodbye" message like in the promotional commercial). The second season marked the show return at the end of the first quarter of 2007 (continuing with the plot that had ended the first season years ago, in which a plane where they were traveling crashing in an island and the family having passed around 5 years living there, to compensate the years that had passed after the first season.), with the show now produced in a 16:9 (HDTV format) and airing constantly new episodes, using the same actors as in the first season (including the fact that the kids starring on it had grown up a lot).

Season 3
A third season was announced to be in production in December 2010. Eugenio Derbez, the producer of the series, admitted that the new season will introduce a new character to the sitcom.

The series began on July 8, 2012 and ended on September 16th of the same year.

Setting
The sitcom is centered on a plush-wearing family who lives in a city called "Ciudad P. Luche" (P. Luche City). However in the "Perdidos" episode, when the family lived mistakenly in Cancun for five years, Cancun's residents did not wear plush. So it can be assumed that only in Ciudad P. Luche, people wear and use plush-related objects.
The P. Luche apartment is the setting most of the time. It is an apartment in a tall building where its exterior appears in an animation piece. Inside, the sofa and rug are made of plush, and the home's walls are covered in brightly colored wallpaper.

Awards

References

External links
 

Mexican television sitcoms
2002 Mexican television series debuts
Television series about dysfunctional families
Television series by Televisa